Springfield Township is one of the fourteen townships of Jefferson County, Ohio, United States.  The 2010 census found 2,367 people in the township, 1,192 of whom lived in the unincorporated portions of the township.

Geography
Located in the far western part of the county, it borders the following townships:
Fox Township, Carroll County - north
Brush Creek Township - northeast
Ross Township - east
Salem Township - southeast
German Township, Harrison County - south
Loudon Township, Carroll County - southwest
Lee Township, Carroll County - west

Several populated places are located in Springfield Township:
The village of Amsterdam, in the west
The village of Bergholz, in the north
The unincorporated community of Wolf Run, in the east

Name and history
Springfield Township was established in 1804. It is the oldest township in Jefferson County.

In the early 19th century, Springfield Township was the residence of the "Blind Twaddle" family, a family of nine children, six of whom were born blind.  At the time, they were considered one of the most remarkable families in the state of Ohio, and perhaps the United States.  They attracted universal attention from physicians and scientific men throughout the world.  In 1818, the Ohio State Legislature passed "An act for the relief of John Twaddle", granting a quarter section of land to John and Mary Twaddle, the parents of the six blind children.

It is one of eleven Springfield Townships statewide.

Government
The township is governed by a three-member board of trustees, who are elected in November of odd-numbered years to a four-year term beginning on the following January 1. Two are elected in the year after the presidential election and one is elected in the year before it. There is also an elected township fiscal officer, who serves a four-year term beginning on April 1 of the year after the election, which is held in November of the year before the presidential election. Vacancies in the fiscal officership or on the board of trustees are filled by the remaining trustees.

References

External links
County website

Townships in Jefferson County, Ohio
Townships in Ohio